The Portuguese legislative election, 1851 was held on 2 and 16 November.

Parties
Cartistas
Regeneradores históricos

Results

References

Legislative elections in Portugal
1851 elections in Europe
1851 in Portugal
November 1851 events